Úna MacLochlainn (born 1987) is an Irish singer-songwriter.

Career
MacLochlainn is a native of New Inn, County Galway. Her first album, Willow Tree, was released in 2008. She has supported acts such as Sharon Shannon, Don Baker, Mary Coughlan and Johnny Duhan. She is a multi-instrumentalist, performing on the guitar, piano, cello, violin and viola, as well as singing.

Musicians from County Galway
1987 births
Living people
Irish songwriters
21st-century Irish singers
21st-century Irish women singers